T. V. Rajeswar (28 August 1926 in Salem, Tamil Nadu – 14 January 2018 in New Delhi) was an Indian Police Service officer, an Intelligence Bureau chief and a Governor of Sikkim, West Bengal and Uttar Pradesh.  He was awarded the Padma Vibhushan in 2012.
He died on 14 January 2018.

Career
He was born to Gurusamipalayam weaver Marimuthu Mudaliar in Rasipuram Taluka of old Salem district. He completed his primary education at Gurusamipalayam Sengunthar Mahajana School and later obtained his Master's degree in Economics from Presidency College, Madras University.

He passed the Indian Police Service (IPS) examination in 1949. The Government of India then ordered him to serve as Superintendent of Police (SP) for Nizamabad, Raichur and Guntur districts in Hyderabad.
He then served as the Deputy Commissioner of Hyderabad for many years.

He was Lt. Governor of Arunachal Pradesh from August 1983 to November 1985. From November 1985 to March 1989 he served as Governor of Sikkim. He was Governor of West Bengal from 20 March 1989 to 7 February 1990 and Governor of Uttar Pradesh from 8 July 2004 to 27 July 2009.

He has a daughter and a son. His daughter Sujatha is a former IFS officer, Indian Ambassador to Germany and Secretary to the Ministry of External Affairs of India.

Notes

External links
 news article

1926 births
2018 deaths
Governors of Rajasthan
Governors of Sikkim
Governors of Uttar Pradesh
Governors of West Bengal
People from Salem, Tamil Nadu
Governors of Arunachal Pradesh
Recipients of the Padma Vibhushan in civil service
Directors of Intelligence Bureau (India)
Indian Police Service officers